The 1999 NCAA Division I-AA Football Championship Game was a postseason college football game between the Georgia Southern Eagles and the Youngstown State Penguins. The game was played on December 18, 1999, at Finley Stadium, home field of the University of Tennessee at Chattanooga. The culminating game of the 1999 NCAA Division I-AA football season, it was won by Georgia Southern, 59–24.

Teams
The participants of the Championship Game were the finalists of the 1999 I-AA Playoffs, which began with a 16-team bracket.

Youngstown State Penguins

Youngstown State finished their regular season with a 9–2 record (5–1 in conference); one of their losses had been to Western Michigan of Division I-A. Seeded ninth in the playoffs, the Penguins defeated eight-seed Montana, 16-seed North Carolina A&T, and 13-seed Florida A&M to reach the final. This was the sixth appearance for Youngstown State in a Division I-AA championship game, having won four titles (1991, 1993, 1994, and 1997) against one loss (1992).

Georgia Southern Eagles

Georgia Southern finished their regular season with a 9–2 record (7–1 in conference); one of their losses had been to Oregon State of Division I-A. The Eagles, seeded second, defeated 15-seed Northern Arizona, 10-seed UMass, and sixth-seed Illinois State to reach the final. This was the seventh appearance for Georgia Southern in a Division I-AA championship game, having four prior wins (1985, 1986, 1989, 1990) and two prior losses (1988, 1998).

Game summary

Scoring summary

Game statistics

References

Further reading

External links
1999 I-AA National Championship - Georgia Southern vs Youngstown State via YouTube
Adrian Peterson Georgia Southern "The Run" Compaq Play of the Week via YouTube

Championship Game
NCAA Division I Football Championship Games
Georgia Southern Eagles football games
Youngstown State Penguins football games
College football in Tennessee
American football competitions in Chattanooga, Tennessee
NCAA Division I-AA Football Championship Game
NCAA Division I-AA Football Championship Game